Heidelberg Hall, also known as The Weigley Mansion, is located at 1373 Heidelberg Avenue, Schaefferstown, Lebanon County, Pennsylvania is a reddish-brown sandstone grand mansion designed in the Second Empire architectural style. It was built from 1876 to 1882, for William M. Weigley, one of Lebanon County’s wealthiest and most influential men during the late nineteenth century, and designed by the noted Philadelphia architect Isaac Harding Hobbs. The architectural firm of Isaac H. Hobbs & Son was known for designing various structures including churches, banks, office buildings and schools using various architectural styles including Gothic Revival, Italian Villa, Renaissance Revival, Chalet, and Greek Revival. Their most publicized work was expressively ornate mansard-roofed suburban and country residences which includes the Weigley Mansion, and was published in Godey’s Lady’s Magazine in April 1875, Scientific American in July 1875, and Isaac Hobbs 1876 publication still in print by Dover Publications.

Weigley Mansion (Heidelberg Hall) is a classic example of Gilded Age exuberance as it includes design features such as two front towers, detailed chestnut wood moldings, thick solid paneled chestnut interior doors, a projecting second-story open porch, ornamental cast iron roof crests, three large formal entrance ways, high decorative plaster ceilings, several ornate chandeliers, a grand main staircase and nine fireplaces.

William M. Weigley
William M. Weigley (1818-1887) was educated at the Tulpehocken Academy near Stouchsburg, PA. He began his business career working as a clerk in retail stores, and eventually purchased a store originally owned by Abraham Rex in Schaefferstown. After expanding his business holdings into other area retail stores he purchased several farms, a stone quarry and a grist mill. In 1841, he married Anna Rex, and they had three children: Anna Isadore, Rex and William Wallace. He was known as a philanthropist and was involved with many community improvement projects including the funding of the local fire company, Sunday schools, churches and various civic organizations. He was able to rebound from near-financial collapse during the Panic of 1857, and at the time of his death was a very wealthy person.

History

During the construction of the structure William Weigley changed Hobbs’ original first floor plan of a plain scullery (workroom) to a finished breakfast and sitting room. This was a common practice in the nineteenth century during the construction of extravagant houses. William Weigley’s desire to showcase his wealth in a large eloquent mansion did not last long for him as he died only a few years after his mansion was completed. However, his family lived in the mansion until the 1940s. The Weigley family sold the mansion to a local jeweler who set up a jewelry store on the first floor parlor room. Over the past several decades the mansion has been owned by different private individuals who have kept it in mostly original condition. Recently knows as Heidelberg Hall. Guests can tour this living museum and private home by appointment. Open on weekends, see Heidelberg Hall on Facebook for tours and additional info.

Legacy

Weigley Mansion (Heidelberg Hall) is one of Lebanon County's most iconic surviving historic landmarks and leading example of master craftsmanship in an 19th-century second empire brown sandstone mansion, featuring some of the best examples of the gilded age, showcasing one of the largest private collection of 19th century American crafted furniture.

References

External links
 [https://www.heidelberghall.com
 [https://facebook.com/heidelberghall 
 Pennsylvania Architectural Field Guide: Second Empire/Mansard Style 1860 - 1900.
 The Second Empire Strikes Back.
 The Unfair Typecasting of Second Empire Style.
 Heidelberg Hall - Historic Schaefferstown, Pennsylvania.

Buildings and structures completed in 1882
Second Empire architecture in Pennsylvania
Houses in Lebanon County, Pennsylvania
Lebanon County, Pennsylvania
Gilded Age mansions